South Karelia is a region of Finland. It borders the regions of Kymenlaakso, South Savo and North Karelia, as well as Russia (Republic of Karelia and Leningrad Oblast).

Historical province 
For history, geography and culture see: Finnish Karelia

Regional Council 
The Regional Council of South Karelia is a joint municipal authority of nine member municipalities. The council operates as the authority for regional development and unit for regional planning and looks after regional interests and to promote economic development and cultural well-being in South Karelia. The council has statutory responsibility for regional development and planning.

The EU's regional Objective Programmes for South Karelia have partly been prepared in the council as it also implements and coordinates various projects. The council is also represented  in several international organisations, such as AEBR.

Municipalities

The region of South Karelia is made up of nine municipalities, of which two have city status (marked in bold).

Imatra Sub-region:
 Imatra
Population: 
 Parikkala
Population: 
 Rautjärvi
Population: 
 Ruokolahti (Ruokolax)
Population: 

Lappeenranta Sub-region:
 Lappeenranta (Villmanstrand)
Population: 
 Lemi
Population: 
 Luumäki
Population: 
 Savitaipale
Population: 
 Taipalsaari
Population:

Tourism
South Karelia is a popular tourist area in Finland with its special features – its nature, its location between Lake Saimaa and the border as well as its cultural heritage and history as a border region. Thanks to the natural attractions, waterways and islands, tourism has natural prerequisites for developing in South Karelia. The provincial centres are continuously improving their services. Lappeenranta has in recent years focused particularly on tourism services for families, and Imatra on fishing and spa tourism. There is a good selection of agritourism attractions and tourism services available around the region.

The most interesting attractions include Lake Saimaa, Saimaa Canal, Lappeenranta Fortification and Imatrankoski rapids, the Russian border and the short distance to Vyborg and St. Petersburg. Lappeenranta Fortification and its museums portray the history of the border zone and border arrangements over several centuries. Cruises on Lake Saimaa and along Saimaa Canal up to Vyborg are a unique tourist attraction for Finns and foreigners alike. The high quality guest marinas draw yachters to Lake Saimaa all the way from international waters.

The region also features an interesting cross-section of churches that represent various centuries, architectural styles and denominations. The internationally best-known of these is the Church of the Three Crosses in Imatra designed by Alvar Aalto.

The South Karelian nature has played a key role in the history of tourism. The rapids of Imatrankoski and their surroundings became the first actual tourist attraction in Finland. Russian upper classes and civil servants, in particular, came to marvel at the wild foams of the rapids. In the summer of 1772, Russian Empress Catherine the Great visited Imatra for one day. Her journey from St. Petersburg to Imatra took five days. The rulers and dignitaries of many other countries have left a memento of their visit in the rocks surrounding the rapids. Actual tourism in the modern sense developed in the 19th century. It was speeded up by the completion of Saimaa Canal and St. Petersburg railway in the latter half of the century. What also drew tourists all the way from St. Petersburg was the good fishing to be had in River Vuoksi, Imatra Rapids and Lake Saimaa.

The Rauha – Tiuruniemi area by the Lake Saimaa has long traditions in spa and hotel activities. As early as 1894 the area's first hotel spa - Rauha pensionat för turister - was established. In 1912 a Russia-born physicist Dimitri Gabrilovitsch bought the place to transform it into a sanatorium. The clinic's services at the time were different kinds of baths as well as galvanic and bright light treatments. The clinic had visitors from Russia, Europe and even the Americas. The spa in Lappeenranta, which is still in business today, was founded in 1871.

Tourism in South Karelia went into a decline for some time after the First World War ended the flows of travellers from St. Petersburg. Interest in domestic travel, which had arisen towards the end of the 19th century, increased as conditions became more settled in the newly independent Finland. Tourism had its heyday before the 1930s depression. The area, including Lake Saimaa and the legendary beaches of Terijoki, was a popular area for holiday villas. Tourism was once more affected by the closing of the borders after the Second World War. The unspoilt nature and Lake Saimaa attracted tourists especially from Central Europe and the Nordic countries. The Germans discovered the rented holiday houses on the shores of Saimaa.

Nature
The ground in the region consists of loose soil types accumulated on top of bedrock during the last ice age, as the ice sheet retreated to the northwest. The soil shaped by the Ice Age is still clearly visible in the South Karelian environment and scenery. The greatest natural wonder in South Karelia consists of the parallel dividers called Salpausselkä, which transect the region, and their large edge formations. At its steepest, the divider plunges into Lake Saimaa in Kyläniemi village of Taipalsaari.

The variable terrain and great local height differences make South Karelia exceptional in Southern Finland. As a contrast to the rugged rocky islands of Saimaa and flat pinewoods, the region features lush deciduous woodlands reaching out from the Ladogian Karelia around Parikkala, Imatra and Lappeenranta. Parikkala and Rautjärvi are clearly different from other areas in the region, with the Ladogian Karelia even affecting their climate. The lush deciduous zone with great biodiversity shelters the most valuable wetlands of Finland. Bird wetland habitats of national importance are found in Siikalahti and Tarassiinlahti of Parikkala and Kuokkalampi in Ruokolahti. These wetlands harbour endangered habitats – birds, dragonflies, bats and butterflies.

Education

Lappeenranta has been voted the best university town in Finland. The campus is welcoming, there are plenty of flats available and international student exchanges are competently organised. Most importantly, however, the education offered is versatile and of a high standard. The study programmes are being developed with an open mind. Some years ago, Lappeenranta University of Technology decided to include business studies in the curriculum. The university and Saimaa University of Applied Sciences were the first in Finland to suggest mutual co-operation between these two types of third-level educational institutes.

Heraldry

The coat of arms of South Karelia is composed of the arms of Karelia.

Politics
Results of the Finnish parliamentary election, 2019 in South Karelia:

 Social Democratic Party   27.27%
 Finns Party   18.70%
 National Coalition Party   17.46%
 Centre Party   15.54%
 Green League   10.35%
 Christian Democrats   3.86%
 Left Alliance   2.87%
 Movement Now   1.65%
 Blue Reform   1.34%
 Seven Star Movement   0.27%
 Other parties   0.69%

References

External links

South Karelia Region website
goSaimaa.com – travel information about South Karelia
The Regional Council of South Karelia
Regional brochure
South Karelia Museum

 
Southern Finland Province
Karelia South